Moomal Ji Mari is an archaeological site in a village near Mirpur Mathelo in the Ghotki District of Sindh, Pakistan.

Many clay toys and artifacts were found through archaeological excavation, along with the remains of walls made from baked and unbaked bricks. Glazed and unglazed shards of pottery of different kinds was observed on the mound. It is believed to be house of Moomal, a daughter of Raja Nand who constructed a palace for her on the mound. This palace was built around 590 AD during the reign of Rai Sahasi II. in Rai dynasty of Sindh. A cultural complex has been built by the Antiquities department, Government of Sindh. Some historians relate it to the love tale of Momal Rano of Soomra Dynasty of Sindh. Rano was Sodho by caste.

References

History of Sindh
Archaeological sites in Pakistan
Ancient history of Pakistan
Ruins in Pakistan
Tourist attractions in Sindh
Archaeological sites in Sindh
Ghotki District